Francis Mennie (30 October 1923 – 28 June 1997) was a Scottish footballer who played as a left back for Kilmarnock, Queen's Park (three seasons of unofficial competitions during World War II), Clyde and Portadown (Northern Ireland). He appeared in the 1949 Scottish Cup Final with Clyde, a defeat to Rangers, and claimed the Gold Cup with Portadown in 1953, scoring the winning goal in the final.

Mennie appeared in two unofficial wartime international matches for Scotland in 1945 (the players who travelled to Belgium were all serving armed forces personnel – he was with the Royal Air Force) and was selected once for the Scottish Football League XI against the English Football League XI in 1949.

References

1923 births
1997 deaths
Footballers from Coatbridge
Scottish footballers
Royal Air Force personnel of World War II
Association football defenders
Queen's Park F.C. wartime guest players
Kilmarnock F.C. players
Clyde F.C. players
Portadown F.C. players
Scottish Football League players
Scotland wartime international footballers
Scottish Football League representative players
NIFL Premiership players